KNLB (91.1 FM) is an American radio station broadcasting a Christian radio format at 91.1 MHz. It is licensed to Lake Havasu City, Arizona, and serves the Laughlin area. KNLB is available on several translators, and throughout North and Central America via Free To Air Satellite on Galaxy 19 at 97w and on channel 1005 on Glorystar Christian Satellite.  The station is owned by Advance Ministries, Inc.

KNLB has been granted a U.S. Federal Communications Commission construction permit to move to a new transmitter site, change to Class C0, change to a directional antenna, increase ERP to 15,000 watts and HAAT to 800 meters.

Several translators simulcast the signal throughout the Mojave Desert:

References

External links

NLB
Lake Havasu City, Arizona
Radio stations established in 1977
1977 establishments in Arizona